The Arlon Synagogue was a synagogue in the Belgian town of Arlon. Built in 1863 and inaugurated in 1865, it was the first synagogue built in Belgium. Today religious services are rare, as the majority of Jews have left Arlon.

The synagogue was spared destruction during the Second World War, but the building was turned into a straw depot. The synagogue's concierge kept the Torah scroll safe during the war.

In 2005, the synagogue was classified as a Major Heritage Building of Wallonia. 

Between 2014 and 2019, the synagogue was closed, requiring major structural renovations.

References

External links 
 Présentation de la synagogue d’Arlon sur le site du Consistoire

Synagogues in Belgium
Synagogues completed in 1863
1863 establishments in Belgium
Arlon
Buildings and structures in Luxembourg (Belgium)